Harpalus atrichatus is a species of ground beetle in the subfamily Harpalinae. It was described by Hatch in 1949.

References

atrichatus
Beetles described in 1949